Stigg of the Dump is an underground hip hop producer based in Halifax, Nova Scotia.

History
Stigg of the Dump released the debut EP, Still Alive at the Veglia Lounge, on Endemik Music in 2002.

He is one half of the instrumental hip hop group Villain Accelerate. The duo released an album, Maid of Gold, on Mush Records in 2003.

Discography

Albums
 Maid of Gold (2003) (with Sixtoo, as Villain Accelerate)

EPs
 Still Alive at the Veglia Lounge (2002)

References

External links
 

Year of birth missing (living people)
Canadian hip hop record producers
Living people